Kaduppassery  is a village in Mukundapuram taluk, Thrissur district in the state of Kerala, India.

History
It is one of the  villages formed out of the old Thazhekkad proverti.

Demographics
 India census, Kaduppassery had a population of 8196 with 3957 males and 4239 females.

References

Villages in Thrissur district